The 2010 ICC Africa Under-19 Championships or 2010 ICC Africa Under-19 World Cup Qualifiers were two cricket events organised by the African Cricket Association. The championships were played over two divisions and provided African U-19 teams with the chance to qualify for the 2012 U-19 World Cup. The second division was held from 26–30 July in Big Bend, Swaziland and the first division from 29 August-5 September in Windhoek, Namibia.

Division two

This was only the second playing of Division Two and it followed the same round-robin format as the previous year. The venue and dates were confirmed in May to be at Big Bend, a small village in the Lowveld region of Swaziland, from 26–30 July. All matches were played on three fields at and around the Ubombo Country Club. The winners would be promoted to the Division One Tournament.

Teams

The following five teams took part in the tournament:

Relegated from 2009 Division One:

Remaining from 2009 Division Two:

Ghana, who took part the year before, were originally included in the line up, but did not end up participating.

Matches

Note: Full scorecards are not available for all matches

Points Table

Division One

Teams

Eight African affiliate nations are participating in this competition and these are:

Matches

Each team will play every other team in a round-robin format. Final placings will be decided by wins and then run rate. Points are allocated: 2-Win, 1-Tie/No Result, 0-Loss.

The top two teams will progress to the U19 CWC Global Qualifiers

Day 1 - Uganda def Nigeria, Namibia def Botswana, Kenya def Zambia, Sierra Leone def Tanzania

Day 2 - Uganda def Tanzania, Namibia def Zambia, Nigeria def Botswana, Kenya def Sierra Leone

Day 3 - Namibia def Sierra Leone, Kenya def Tanzania, Botswana def Uganda, Zambia def Nigeria

Day 4 - Namibia def Tanzania, Uganda def Kenya, Sierra Leone def Nigeria, Botswana def Zambia

Day 5 - Namibia def Kenya, Botswana def Sierra Leone, Zambia def Uganda, Nigeria def Tanzania

Day 6 - Namibia def Uganda, Botswana def Tanzania, Kenya def Nigeria, Zambia def Sierra Leone

Day 7 - Kenya def Botswana, Namibia def Nigeria, Uganda def Sierra Leone, Zambia def Tanzania

Live Scores

Live scores are available through the WebCricket service provided by Cobitech.

Live scores are available for mobile phones through the WebCricket.mobi site.

Points Table

References

International cricket competitions in 2010
Cricket in Eswatini
International cricket competitions in Namibia
International sports competitions hosted by Eswatini
Sport in Windhoek
ICC Africa Under-19 Championships, 2010
2010 in Namibian sport
Cri
21st century in Windhoek